Finch Hotel was an inn located in current-day Toronto, Ontario, Canada. Before Finch's takeover, the inn was owned by Thomas Johnson from the late 1790s.

Finch Avenue, a main arterial road in Toronto and the surrounding Peel Region and Durham Region, was named after John Finch.

Information
Finch Hotel was operated by a series of innkeepers:
 Thomas Palmer 1848-1860
 John Likens 1860-1864
 John Fenley 1869-1871
 William Kirk 1871-1873

The inn was sold to Charles McBride, who demolished the building and took timbers to build the Bedford Park Hotel at another site on Yonge Street. The site is now a parkette and condos on 1 and 3 Pemberton Avenue. To the west of the hotel was Stop 35 of the North Yonge Railways, a radial railway that ran from Toronto to Lake Simcoe.

See also
 Finch Avenue

References

Notes
 A Glimpse of Toronto's History City Planning Division, Urban Development Services, City of Toronto 2001, MPLS 087

Hotels in Toronto
Defunct hotels in Canada
Demolished buildings and structures in Toronto
Hotel buildings completed in 1848
Hotels established in 1848
1848 establishments in Ontario
Buildings and structures demolished in 1873
Canadian companies established in 1848
Demolished hotels